Melba Jean Trinidad Vasquez (born February 27, 1951) is an American psychologist who served as the 2011 president of the American Psychological Association (APA). Vasquez was the APA's first Latina president. She has authored multiple works on ethics in psychotherapy. She is in private practice in Texas.

Career
Melba J. T. Vasquez attended Southwest Texas State University (now Texas State University-San Marcos) and majored in English and political science.  She was a middle school English and political science teacher before beginning a psychology career. She received a PhD in counseling psychology from The University of Texas in 1978, then worked at the university's counseling center. She taught psychology both at The University of Texas and at Colorado State University before moving into private practice. She has been in practice in Austin, Texas since 1991.

When Vasquez was elected president of the APA in 2011, she became the first Latina elected to the position. She had previously served as president of the Texas Psychological Association, the Society of Counseling Psychology (APA Division 17) and the Society for the Psychology of Women (APA Division 35). She cofounded the Society for the Psychological Study of Ethnic Minority Issues (APA Division 45). She coauthored Ethics for Psychologists: A Commentary on the APA Ethics Code and four editions of Ethics in Psychotherapy and Counseling: A Practical Guide. In 2007, Vasquez was recognized with the Alfred M. Wellner Senior Career Psychologist Award from the National Register of Health Service Providers in Psychology.
She was also recognized as a Distinguished Practitioner of Psychology in the National Academies of Practice.

References

American women psychologists
Hispanic and Latino American social scientists
Presidents of the American Psychological Association
Texas State University alumni
1951 births
Living people